YU Grupa is the third studio album from Serbian and former Yugoslav rock band YU Grupa. YU Grupa is the band's second self-titled album, the first one being their debut album released in 1973.

Track listing

Personnel
Dragi Jelić – guitar, vocals
Žika Jelić – bass guitar, vocals
Ratislav Đelmaš – drums

References 
YU Grupa at Discogs
 EX YU ROCK enciklopedija 1960-2006,  Janjatović Petar;

External links 
YU Grupa at Discogs

YU Grupa albums
1975 albums
Jugoton albums